Metrosideros robusta, the northern rātā, is a forest tree endemic to New Zealand. In disturbed ground, or where there are gaps in the forest cover, northern rātā will grow on the ground with a normal but short trunk.

Distribution
Northern rātā is found in the North Island from Te Paki in the north to Wellington in the south. Formerly widespread, it is now uncommon over large parts of its former range, and is apparently absent from all but the south-east of Hawkes Bay. In the South Island, northern rātā is common from Nelson to Greymouth and Hokitika. It reaches its southern limit near Lake Mahinapua at 42°4′ South latitude. The natural habitat is forest along the coasts and in the lowlands. In some parts of its range northern rātā occurs in montane forest. Formerly, with rimu (Dacrydium cupressinum) it was a dominant tree in a forest type known as rimu/rātā forest.

Description

Northern rātā is a massive tree, easily distinguished from other Metrosideros species by its small, leathery, dark green leaves that are 25–50mm long by 15–25mm wide, and have a distinct notch at the tip. Young growth is generally pink and covered in fine rust-coloured hairs that are gradually shed as the foliage ages but tend to persist at the midrib and in the vicinity of the leaf base. The flowers, borne in sprays on the tips of branches, are a mass of dark scarlet stamens. Flowering peaks between November and January, and seeds take a year or slightly more to ripen. The bark is usually brown or grey-brown and rather corky and provides an ideal stratum for the roots of epiphytic plants such as Astelia species and Freycinetia banksii (kiekie). The wood is reddish brown, and the manner of its growth results in a twisted grain.

Hemi-epiphytic growth habit
Northern rātā often begins life as hemi-epiphyte, and the resultant tree has a hollow trunk up to 4 m in diameter made up of interlocking roots that enclose the space left by the former host tree.  The host tree of epiphytic northern rātā is usually rimu. In former times, the tree was described as a 'strangler', however it may be that rātā can only establish in trees that are already in decline. Northern rātā usually occurs in hardwood, podocarp, and southern beech forests. It is often associated with such species as rewarewa, tawa, hīnau, kānuka, kahikatea, kāmahi, kohekohe, pukatea and māhoe.

Conservation
The greatest threat to northern rata is browsing by introduced possums (Trichosurus vulpecula), which cause severe damage by eating the leaves, buds, flowers and young shoots of the tree. In severe cases this can lead to the death of the tree within two years. In some districts, this has resulted in the local loss of the species. The situation of the species has been improved through the efforts of Project Crimson. Hybridisation with pōhutukawa is another threat to the survival of northern rātā. Pōhutukawa has naturalised in areas south of its natural range, and poses a problem in localities where the northern or southern rātā species are present. Other threats include cutting for firewood, and forest clearance for roading or construction.

Cultivation
Northern rātā may be propagated readily from fresh seed. Viability of the seed drops quickly after a few weeks or if it is allowed to dry out. Cuttings do not strike readily, but better results can be obtained from using water shoots.

At least three cultivars of northern rātā have been released. There are also known cultivars of hybrids between northern rātā and pōhutukawa (known as Metrosideros ×sub-tomentosa), and between northern rātā and southern rātā. Known cultivars include:

∞ Hybrid of northern rātā and southern rātā
¤ Hybrid of northern rātā and pōhutukawa

See also

Metrosideros excelsa, pōhutukawa
Metrosideros umbellata, southern rātā
Metrosideros bartlettii, Bartlett's rātā
Metrosideros parkinsonii, Parkinson's rātā

References 

Salmon, J.T., 1986. The Native Trees of New Zealand. Wellington: Heinneman Reed.
Simpson, P., 2005. Pōhutukawa & Rātā: New Zealand's Iron-Hearted Trees. Wellington: Te Papa Press.

 

robusta
Endemic flora of New Zealand
Trees of New Zealand
Epiphytes